Puntius deccanensis, the Deccan barb, is a critically endangered species of ray-finned fish in the genus Puntius. It is endemic to the Northern Western Ghats in India.

References 

Deccan barb
Freshwater fish of India
Fauna of the Western Ghats
Deccan barb